Cystoseira is a genus of brown algae in the order Fucales.

Description
Cystoseira is characterized by highly differentiated basal and apical regions and the presence of catenate pneumatocysts (air-vesicles). In Cystoseira old plants have an elongated main axis, and in time the primary laterals become proportionally elongated. Their lower parts are strongly flattened into ‘foliar expansions’ or basal leaves. Fertile regions which bear conceptacles are known as receptacles. These are normally found at the tips of the branches. Their basal and apical regions are highly differentiated. They have catenate pnuematocysts (air vesicles). The aerocyst or air vesicles keep the organism erect, by causing it to float in strong currents.

Distribution
Cystoseira is one of the most widely distributed genera of the Fucales order and provides an essential habitat for many epiphytes, invertebrates, and fish. Cystoseira is found mostly in temperate regions of the Northern Hemisphere, such as the Mediterranean, Indian, and Pacific Oceans.

Bioindicators
Cystoseira depend on good water quality, and can be used for bioindication. This was discovered in a study of Cystoseira species undertaken on Menorca.

Species
The following species are listed in the World Register of Marine Species:

Cystoseira abies-marina (S.G.Gmelin) C.Agardh, 1820
Cystoseira algeriensis Feldmann, 1945
Cystoseira amentacea (C.Agardh) Bory de Saint-Vincent, 1832
Cystoseira baccata (S.G.Gmelin) P.C.Silva, 1952
Cystoseira barbata (Stackhouse) C.Agardh, 1820
Cystoseira barbatula Kützing
Cystoseira brachycarpa J.Agardh, 1896
Cystoseira compressa (Esper) Gerloff & Nizamuddin, 1975
Cystoseira corniculata (Turner) Zanardini, 1841
Cystoseira crassipes (Mertens ex Turner) C.Agardh, 1821
Cystoseira crinita Duby, 1830
Cystoseira crinitophylla Ercegovic, 1952
Cystoseira dubia Valiante
Cystoseira elegans Sauvageau, 1912
Cystoseira fimbriata Bory de Saint-Vincent, 1832
Cystoseira foeniculacea (Linnaeus) Greville, 1830
Cystoseira funkii Schiffner ex Gerloff & Nizamuddin, 1976
Cystoseira geminata C.Agardh, 1824
Cystoseira hakodatensis (Yendo) Fensholt, 1952
Cystoseira helvetica Heer, 1877
Cystoseira humilis Schousboe ex Kützing, 1860
Cystoseira hyblaea G.Giaccone, 1985
Cystoseira indica (Thivy & Doshi) Mairh, 1968
Cystoseira jabukae Ercegovic, 1952
Cystoseira mauritanica Sauvageau, 1911
Cystoseira mediterranea Sauvageau, 1912
Cystoseira montagnei J.Agardh, 1842
Cystoseira neglecta Setchell & N.L.Gardner, 1917
Cystoseira nodicaulis (Withering) M.Roberts, 1967
Cystoseira osmundacea (Turner) C.Agardh, 1820
Cystoseira pelagosae Ercegovic, 1952
Cystoseira planiramea Schiffner
Cystoseira platyclada Sauvageau, 1912
Cystoseira rayssiae E.Ramon, 2000
Cystoseira sauvageauana G.Hamel, 1939
Cystoseira sauvageaueana G.Hamel, 1939
Cystoseira schiffneri G.Hamel, 1939
Cystoseira sedoides (Desfontaines) C.Agardh, 1820
Cystoseira selaginioides
Cystoseira setchellii N.L.Gardner, 1913
Cystoseira sonderi (Kützing) Piccone
Cystoseira spinosa Sauvageau, 1912
Cystoseira squarrosa De Notaris, 1841
Cystoseira stricta
Cystoseira susanensis Nizamuddin, 1985
Cystoseira tamariscifolia (Hudson) Papenfuss, 1950
Cystoseira trinodis (Forsskål) C.Agardh, 1820
Cystoseira usneoides (Linnaeus) M.Roberts, 1968
Cystoseira wildpretii Nizamuddin, 1995
Cystoseira wildprettii Nizamuddin
Cystoseira zosteroides C.Agardh, 1820

References

 
 

Fucales
Fucales genera
Taxa named by Jacob Georg Agardh